Loveaholic is the second studio album by Spanish singer Ruth Lorenzo, released on 9 March 2018.

Promotion

Singles
"Good Girls Don’t Lie" was released as the album's lead single on 13 October 2017. The song debuted at number 3 on the Spanish Singles Chart.

Promotional singles
Prior to the album's release, three songs were released as promotional singles. "My Last Song" was the first to be released on 14 February 2018. "Loveaholic" was released on 23 February 2018. "Bring Back the New" was released on 2 March 2018.

Track listing

Charts

References

2018 albums